French Island is a small island in the Sacramento–San Joaquin River Delta. It is part of Solano County, California. It appears on USGS maps in 1952 and 1978, with the same shape and elevation.

References

Islands of Solano County, California
Islands of the Sacramento–San Joaquin River Delta
Islands of Northern California